Rajendra Nagar is a residential locality in Indore, Madhya Pradesh, India. It is located in south-west part and is one of the greenest localities of Indore. more than 60% population is from Maharashtra & nearer to MHOW (Military Headquarters of WAR) and largest military cantonment in Asia.

About
Rajendra Nagar is one of the semi old area of Indore, some say it as Suburban Indore. According to mouth spreading information it came to existence in years around the 1960s. Mr. Jayesh Sharma( residing near triangular garden) was first person to move here. A Railway station on famous Delhi-Hyderabad Meter gauge line was founded in the 1970s, that was the only source for the transportation on olden times.

Rajendra Nagar, Indore is known for Institute Of Engineering & Science IPS Academy, Indore which is situated on NH-3. Rajendra Nagar Railway Station is equipped with 2 Reservation Counters with Broad Gauge line. It is mostly a Hindu dominating area of the city. Presently many infrastructure projects are booming up here as in other places of Indore. The area holds 1000–1500 houses in 6 sectors.

Educational Institutes
Schools

Bal Vihar

Indore Public School

Alpine Public School

Central School ( RRCAT)

Colleges

Indian Institute of Management (IIM)

Institute Of Engineering & Science IPS Academy

Institute Of Business Management & Research IPS Academy

School Of Architecture IPS Academy

IPS Academy

Vaishav Law College

Government Girl Polytechnic

Suburbs of Indore
Neighbourhoods in Indore
Memorials to Rajendra Prasad